Ixhuatán is a town and one of the 119 municipalities of Chiapas, in southern Mexico.

As of 2010, the municipality had a total population of 10,239, up from 8,877 as of 2005 . It covers an area of 72 km².

As of 2010, the town of Ixhuatán had a population of 3,621. Other than the town of Ixhuatán, the municipality had 53 localities, the largest of which (with 2010 populations in parentheses) were: Ignacio Zaragoza (1,222), and Chapayal Grande (1,112), classified as rural.

References

Municipalities of Chiapas